Jai Pal Singh 'Vyast' is an Indian politician and Member of the Bharatiya Janata Party. Vyast is a member of the Uttar Pradesh Legislative Council from the Bareilly-Moradabad Division Graduates Constituency.

References 

Politicians from Bareilly
Bharatiya Janata Party politicians from Uttar Pradesh
Members of the Uttar Pradesh Legislative Council
21st-century Indian politicians
Year of birth missing (living people)
Living people